Douglas Leslie Dewey Bell,  (June 15, 1926 – April 18, 2021) was a Canadian politician who served as the commissioner of Yukon. He was made a Member of the Order of Canada in 1989 and a member of the Order of Yukon in 2019. Bell died at the age of 94 in 2021 after a period of declining health.

References

 History of Yukon Commissioners

1926 births
2021 deaths
Commissioners of Yukon
Members of the Order of Canada
Members of the Order of Yukon
People from Moose Jaw
Politicians from Whitehorse